Lingle Creek is a stream in Johnson County, Iowa, in the United States. It is a tributary to Hoosier Creek.

Lingle Creek was named for Thomas Lingle, who operated a gristmill along the creek in the 1840s.

See also
List of rivers of Iowa

References

Rivers of Johnson County, Iowa
Rivers of Iowa